Vrchteplá is a village and municipality in Považská Bystrica District in the Trenčín Region of north-western Slovakia.

History
In historical records the village was first mentioned in 1430.

Geography
The municipality lies at an altitude of 520 metres and covers an area of 4.897 km2. It has a population of about 256 people.

External links
 
 https://web.archive.org/web/20080208225314/http://www.statistics.sk/mosmis/eng/run.html 

Villages and municipalities in Považská Bystrica District